The 2016–17 TCU Horned Frogs men's basketball team represented Texas Christian University in the 2016–17 NCAA Division I men's basketball season, led by head coach Jamie Dixon in his first season at TCU. The Horned Frogs played their home games at Schollmaier Arena in Fort Worth, Texas as members of the Big 12 Conference. They finished the season 24–15, 6–12 in Big 12 play to finish in a tie for seventh place. They defeated Oklahoma and Kansas in the Big 12 tournament before losing in the semifinals to Iowa State. They received an invitation to the National Invitation Tournament where they defeated Fresno State, Iowa, and Richmond to advance to the semifinals at Madison Square Garden. At MSG, they defeated UCF  to advance to the NIT finals where they beat Georgia Tech to become the 2017 NIT champions.

Previous season 
The Horned Frogs finished the 2015–16 season 12–21, 2–16 in Big 12 play to finish in last place. They defeated Texas Tech in the first round of the Big 12 tournament to advance to the quarterfinals where they lost to West Virginia. Following the season, the school fired head coach Trent Johnson after four seasons at TCU. On March 21, 2016, the school hired Jamie Dixon, an alum of TCU, as head coach.

Preseason 
TCU was picked to finish in last place in the preseason Big 12 poll.

Departures

Transfers

Recruiting

Roster

Schedule and results

|-
!colspan=9 style=| Regular season

|-
!colspan=9 style=| Big 12 tournament

|-
!colspan=9 style=| NIT

|-

Schedule Source: GoFrogs.com

References

Tcu
TCU Horned Frogs men's basketball seasons
Tcu
National Invitation Tournament championship seasons